Capes in the Americas

Cape Virgenes is the southeastern tip of continental Argentina in South America. The southern one, a little to the south-west, is Punta Dungeness. Ferdinand Magellan reached it on 21 October 1520 during the Spanish expedition to East Asia and discovered a strait, now called the Strait of Magellan in his honor. As 21 October was the feast day of Saint Ursula and the Eleven Thousand Virgins, he named the cape in their honor.

The Cape is located in Santa Cruz Province, Patagonia, Argentina. The Cape Virgenes Argentine Lighthouse has been operating since 1904. In 1884, gold was found there sparking the Tierra del Fuego Gold Rush. Recently, rises in the number of southern right whales visiting the area have been confirmed.

Climate

Gallery

References

Headlands of Argentina
Landforms of Santa Cruz Province, Argentina